Cornelius Sullivan (6 June 1903–1988) was an English footballer who played in the Football League for Bradford (Park Avenue), Carlisle United, Hull City and Southend United.

References

1903 births
1988 deaths
English footballers
Association football forwards
English Football League players
Preston North End F.C. players
Swansea City A.F.C. players
Southend United F.C. players
Hull City A.F.C. players
Bradford (Park Avenue) A.F.C. players
Carlisle United F.C. players